Ingrid Linnea Ohlsson (born 31 May 1950) is a Swedish orienteering competitor. She is Relay World Champion from 1976, as a member of the Swedish winning team.

References

1950 births
Living people
Swedish orienteers
Female orienteers
Foot orienteers
World Orienteering Championships medalists